Marco Soria (born 6 June 1953) is a Bolivian former cyclist. He competed in the individual road race and 1000m time trial events at the 1976 Summer Olympics.

References

External links
 

1953 births
Living people
Bolivian male cyclists
Olympic cyclists of Bolivia
Cyclists at the 1976 Summer Olympics
Place of birth missing (living people)